This page lists board and card games, wargames, miniatures games, and tabletop role-playing games published in 2019.  For video games, see 2019 in video gaming.

Games released or invented in 2019
 The Crew
 The Fantasy Trip Legacy Edition
 Ms. Monopoly
 Shasn
 Wingspan

Game awards given in 2019
 Just One won Game of the Year in the Spiel des Jahres.
 Wingsan won the 2019 Kennerspiel des Jahres Winner (Connoisseur-gamer game of the year)
 Root won Game of the Year in the Origins Awards.
UBOOT The Board Game won the Charles S. Roberts Award War Boardgame of the Year.
 Star Crossed, a role-playing game by Alex Roberts and published by Bully Pulpit Games won the Diana Jones Award
 Chronicles of Crime won the American Tabletop Awards Strategy Game award.
 Root won the American Tabletop Awards Complex Game award.
 The Mind won the As d'Or Jeu de l'Année.
 Detective won the As d'Or Grand Prix.
 Mr. Wolf won the As d'Or Jeu de l'Année Enfant.
 Wingspan won the Board Game Quest Awards Game of the Year.
 Wingspan won the Deutscher Spiele Preis.
 Wingspan won the Diamond Climber Award Game of the Year.
 Wingspan won The Dice Tower Game of the Year.
 Root won the Spiel Portugal Jogo do Ano.
 Wingspan won the Golden Geek Award Game of the Year.
 Architects of the West Kingdom, Gizmos, Gunkimono, Planet and Victorian Masterminds won the Mensa Select Award.

Significant games-related events in 2019
 Vlaada Chvátil was inducted into the Origins Hall of Fame.
 Gerald Brom was inducted into the Origins Hall of Fame.
 Mage Knight was inducted into the Origins Hall of Fame.
 Apples to Apples was inducted into the Origins Hall of Fame.

Deaths

See also
List of game manufacturers
2019 in video gaming

References

Games
Games by year